Square Shoulders is a 1929 American silent crime drama film directed by E. Mason Hopper and starring Frank Coghlan Jr., Louis Wolheim and Anita Louise.

Synopsis
After returning from fighting in World War I, a man falls into bad company with some criminals. Sometime later he returns to his hometown and discovers that his wife has died and his son Tad is now an orphan. He raises the funds to send Tad to a military school without letting him know his true identity. When his former criminal associates blackmail him into taking part in a robbery of the school, they are confronted by Tad. His father takes a bullet intended for him and dies.

Cast
 Frank Coghlan Jr. as John W. 'Tad' Collins Jr. 
 Louis Wolheim as John 'Slag' Collins
 Philippe De Lacy as Eddie Cartwright
 Anita Louise as Mary Jane Williams
 C. Montague Shaw as B.T. Cartwright 
 Maurice Black as 	Hook 
 Kewpie Morgan as 	Delicate Don 
 Clarence Geldert as Maj. E.H. Williams - Commandant

References

Bibliography
 Munden, Kenneth White. The American Film Institute Catalog of Motion Pictures Produced in the United States, Part 1. University of California Press, 1997.

External links
 

1929 films
1929 crime films
American silent feature films
American crime films
Films directed by E. Mason Hopper
American black-and-white films
Pathé Exchange films
1920s English-language films
1920s American films